Hugo Kuranda (born May 29, 1910, date of death unknown) was an Austrian skeleton racer who competed in the late 1940s. He competed in the skeleton event at the 1948 Winter Olympics in St. Moritz, but did not finish.

External links
Skeletonsport.com results
Hugo Kuranda's profile at Sports Reference.com

1910 births
Year of death missing
Austrian male skeleton racers
Skeleton racers at the 1948 Winter Olympics
Olympic skeleton racers of Austria
20th-century Austrian people